Verkhnyaya Vodlitsa is a rural locality (a village) in Oshtinskoye Rural Settlement, Vytegorsky District, Vologda Oblast, Russia. The population was 17 as of 2002. There are 2 streets.

Geography 
Verkhnyaya Vodlitsa is located 73 km southwest of Vytegra (the district's administrative centre) by road. Gorny Ruchey is the nearest rural locality.

References 

Rural localities in Vytegorsky District